Fort Nelson (Parker Lake) Water Aerodrome  is located  west northwest of Fort Nelson, British Columbia, Canada.

See also
Fort Nelson Airport
Fort Nelson/Gordon Field Airport
Fort Nelson/Mobil Sierra Airport

References

Seaplane bases in British Columbia
Northern Rockies Regional Municipality
Registered aerodromes in British Columbia